Flakaberg is a village in the Swedish municipality Gällivare on the border with the municipality of Boden. It lies on the slope of the Flakaberget.

Populated places in Norrbotten County